COBACH (Colegio de Bachilleres) is a public secondary education institution in Mexico associated with SEP working under the SEMS (Subsecretaría de Educación Media Superior). It is a decentralized public institution created by presidential decrete in September 26th 1973.  With 20 high school campuses in Mexico City and 27 in different states through the Mexican Republic.

History 
It was established in Mexico City in 1973 during Luis Echeverría government to help cover the demand of high schools that offered a public service to workers and students therefore 20 campuses were opened in Mexico City and also a program (sistema abierto/ open education) for workers who could not attend school normally helping them to get a higher school diploma by taking exams after they studied text books at home or at work. 

The first three campuses were established in Chihuahua offering two shifts, a morning shift from 7 am to 1 pm, and an afternoon shift from 3 pm to 9 pm.

Campuses

References

|Sonora
|Colegio de Bachilleres del estado de Sonora
 Pagina del colegio - https://www.cobachsonora.edu.mx

High schools in Mexico